José Manuel Sapag (born September 28, 1995, in Buenos Aires) is an Argentine motor racing driver.

Racing career 
Sapag began his career in 2014 in the Fórmula Metropolitana, and the next year he reached a podium. In 2016 he made his debut in TC 2000 and returned to compete in the Fórmula Metropolitana, where he won for the first time.

In 2017 he participated in competitions of several championships, highlighting his participation in the TC 2000 season and his victory on the fifth round. He repeated participation in the next season, achieving a victory again.

He made his debut in the Súper TC 2000 as the guest of Federico Iribarne in the 200 km de Buenos Aires 2018. That same year he made his international debut in TCR Europe Touring Car Series and 24H TCE Series. He besides race the Top Race Series season.

In 2019 he was invited again for the 200 km de Buenos Aires, this time by Marcelo Ciarrocchi, and also raced as a starting driver on the last two races, always for the Citroën Total Racing team. He finished seventh in the championship TC 2000 with two wins.

The next year he became a Súper TC 2000 driver with Equipo FDC and Monti Motorsport. Outside his country, he raced in the TCR Europe and World Touring Car Cup with Target Competition, in the latter as a guest driver for two rounds.

In 2021, Sapag did not return to Europe. It remained in the Argentine Super TC 2000 and Top Race V6 championships. In the Super TC 2000 he raced with the Honda factory team but scored only one point, while in the Top Race V6 he managed to win a sprint race. Besides, Sapag obtained a pole position and four podiums in the inaugural season of TCR South America.

Racing record

Complete TCR Europe Touring Car Series results
(key) (Races in bold indicate pole position) (Races in italics indicate fastest lap)

Complete World Touring Car Cup results
(key) (Races in bold indicate pole position) (Races in italics indicate fastest lap)

‡ As Sapag was a Wildcard entry, he was ineligible to score points.

References 

1995 births
Argentine racing drivers
TC 2000 Championship drivers
Racing drivers from Buenos Aires
Living people
World Touring Car Cup drivers
Formula Renault Argentina drivers
Súper TC 2000 drivers
24H Series drivers
TCR Europe Touring Car Series drivers